Blind is the fourth album by English new wave band The Icicle Works, and the last featuring the band’s original line up, 
released in 1988.

Track listing
All songs written by Ian McNabb.

UK version

Side A
"Intro" - 0:29
"Shit Creek" - 4:01
"High Time" - 3:34
"Little Girl Lost" - 4:44
"Starry Blue Eyed Wonder" - 4:12
"One True Love" - 1:51
"Blind" - 5:30

Side B
"Two Two Three" - 2:23
"What Do You Want Me to Do?" - 3:12
"Stood Before Saint Peter" - 5:25
"The Kiss Off" - 4:23
"Here Comes Trouble" - 4:03
"Walk a While With Me" - 4:19

US version
In comparison to the version issued in the UK and Canada, the US version loses four tracks ("Intro", "One True Love", "What Do You Want Me To Do", and "Two Two Three") edits one track ("Shit Creek" is edited to end much earlier), and adds two tracks ("Sure Thing" and "Hot Profit Gospel").  As well, the UK version of "High Time" has a slightly elongated ending in order to mix seamlessly and directly into "Little Girl Lost". The two tracks are NOT consecutive on the US album, and this elongated ending is therefore dropped.

Side A
"The Kiss Off" - 4:22
"Shit Creek" - 2:56
"Little Girl Lost" - 4:45
"Starry Blue Eyed Wonder" - 4:13
"Blind" - 5:36

Side B
"Sure Thing" - 4:55
"Hot Profit Gospel" - 3:44
"High Time" - 3:26
"Stood Before St. Peter" - 5:26
"Here Comes Trouble" - 4:05
"Walk a While With Me" - 4:24

References

1988 albums
The Icicle Works albums
Beggars Banquet Records albums